The canton of Roanne-Sud is a French former administrative division located in the department of Loire and the Rhone-Alpes region. It was disbanded following the French canton reorganisation which came into effect in March 2015. It had 36,417 inhabitants (2012).

The canton comprised the following communes:

Lentigny
Ouches
Pouilly-les-Nonains
Riorges
Roanne (partly)
Saint-Jean-Saint-Maurice-sur-Loire
Saint-Léger-sur-Roanne
Villemontais
Villerest

See also
Cantons of the Loire department

References

Former cantons of Loire (department)
2015 disestablishments in France
States and territories disestablished in 2015